1-2-3 Go is a 1941 Our Gang short comedy film.

It was directed by Edward Cahn, and starred George McFarland, Billie Thomas, Mickey Gubitosi, and Billy Laughlin.

It was the 199th Our Gang short released (200th episode, 111th talking short, 112th talking episode, and 31st-MGM produced episode).From Gianna

Plot
While playing baseball on a busy street in Greenpoint, Mickey is struck by a car. Though he fully recovers from his injuries, Mickey meets several other kids in the hospital who were not so lucky.

Quickly developing a sense of civic responsibility, the Gang members establish the 1-2-3 Go Safety Society, dedicated to lowering the number of auto injuries in their community.

Cast
 Mickey Gubitosi as Mickey
 Billy Laughlin as Froggy
 George McFarland as Spanky
 Billie Thomas as Buckwheat

Additional cast
 Vincent Graeff as Kid umpire
 Giovanna Gubitosi as Kid eating ice cream
 James Gubitosi as Kid giving up home run
 Freddie Walburn as Kid retrieving home run from street
 Barbara Bedford as Ann, a nurse
 Margaret Bert as Nurse at reception desk
 John Dilson as Mayor Of Greenpoint
 Arthur Hoyt as Horace
 May McAvoy as Miss Jones, a nurse
 Anne O'Neil as Horace's wife
 William Tannen as Cab driver
 Joe Young as Man calling for ambulance

See also
 Our Gang filmography

References

External links
 
 

American comedy short films
American black-and-white films
Films directed by Edward L. Cahn
Metro-Goldwyn-Mayer short films
1941 comedy films
Our Gang films
1941 short films
African-American comedy films
1940s English-language films
1940s American films
Films about children